Alex Craig (born 26 April 1997) is a Scottish professional rugby union player who plays for Gloucester in the Premiership Rugby. He plays as a lock.

He previously played for Hartpury College in the BUCS Super League competition and afterwards in the RFU Championship from the 2016–17 season. He previously played for Scotland U20s in the World Rugby Under 20 Championship from 2016 to 2018.

On 14 February 2019, Craig signed his first professional contract with Gloucester, thus promoted to the senior squad from the 2019–20 season.

Craig received his first call up to the senior Scotland squad on 15 January 2020 for the 2020 Six Nations Championship. He made his international debut for Scotland as a replacement versus Italy on 20 March 2021. He gained his second cap, also as a replacement, in Scotland's victory over France in Paris on 26 March 2021. Scotland's first victory against France in Paris since 1999.

References

External links
Gloucester Rugby Profile
Hartpury College Profile
Ultimate Rugby Profile

1998 births
Living people
Gloucester Rugby players
Rugby union locks
Rugby union players from Dumfries
Scotland international rugby union players
Scottish rugby union players